Grange Mutual Casualty Company, commonly known as Grange Insurance, is an American insurance company based in Columbus, Ohio. Grange market's network is about 3,600 independent agents to offer home, auto, life, and business insurance protection to policyholders.
The company, formed in 1935, now operates in 13 states. These states include Georgia, Illinois, Indiana, Iowa, Kentucky, Michigan, Minnesota, Ohio, Pennsylvania, South Carolina, Tennessee, Virginia, and Wisconsin.

History

Pre-Grange

In February 1933, the Town and Village Insurance Company Services worked under an agreement with Grange Insurance Services, Inc. to write automobile insurance for members of the Ohio State Grange. Grange Insurance Services, Inc. served as a general agent in Ohio and conducted all sales efforts and promotions. Town and Village Insurance Services then wrote business under a special automobile policy provided by the New Century Casualty Company of Chicago, Illinois.

Early history

On March 25, 1935, Grange Mutual Casualty Company was formed as a non-profit corporation under the General Code of Ohio and as such, assumed the book of business from Town and Village Insurance Services. Its principal business was writing property and casualty insurance coverage for policyholders as a mutual insurance company.

Grange Mutual was originally an assessment company, and limited its sales to Ohio State Grange members. In 1942, a new hospitalization policy was introduced and offered to Grange members.  In 1944, a general liability policy was added to the Grange line of products. Fire and extended coverages became available in 1955. By this time, Grange was a multiple line company. In 1958, Grange Mutual became independent of Ohio State Grange, and offered its products to the general public within the State of Ohio.

Expansion

On December 31, 1989, Grange Mutual purchased all the issued and outstanding shares of NWNL General Insurance Company, a Minnesota property and casualty insurance company.  The name was changed to Trustgard Insurance Company effective February 28, 1990. Trustgard began the direct marketing of personal lines automobile and homeowners insurance in Missouri and Kansas in the early to mid 1990s. In 1996, Grange decided to convert Trustgard to an independent agency company. Currently, Trustgard writes primarily new and renewal non-standard automobile policies.

In March 1995, a new stock subsidiary of Grange Mutual named Grange Indemnity Insurance Company was formed in Ohio and currently writes primarily renewal non-standard automobile policies.

In 2002, Grange Mutual Casualty Company partnered with Integrity Insurance, a small-sized company.  Through this affiliation, Grange serves Wisconsin, Iowa, and Minnesota.

Grange Property and Casualty Insurance Company was formed in 2004 to write additional business in the Grange territories in Ohio, Kentucky, and Georgia. Grange Property and Casualty was created for the purpose of offering new personal lines products in the market and currently writes new and renewal homeowner policies.

Companies

Grange Mutual Casualty Company has policyholders in 13 different states:

The Grange Mutual Casualty Group includes a family of different companies:
Grange Mutual Casualty Group
Grange Property & Casualty Insurance Company
Trustgard Insurance Company
Grange Indemnity Insurance Company
Grange Insurance Company of Michigan
Grange Life Insurance Company
Integrity Mutual Insurance Company
Integrity Property & Casualty Company

Non-insurance-related

Sponsorships
Grange Insurance Audubon Center, a nature conservation center that opened in August 2009.
St. Stephen’s Community House, an organization that serves families in need.  Grange provides an executive to serve on its board, covers the cost of printing materials, and makes cash contributions.

Awards
Grange has received numerous awards from agent and industry associations
A.M. Best rating of “A” (Excellent)
BBB Accredited Business since 7/21/1970
Columbus Business First 2012 Corporate Caring Award.
United Way of Central Ohio 2014 Employee Volunteerism award.

See also
 List of United States insurance companies
 Mutual Insurance

References

External links
 

Financial services companies of the United States
Insurance companies of the United States
Privately held companies of the United States
Privately held companies based in Ohio
Mutual insurance companies
Financial services companies established in 1935
1935 establishments in Ohio
Companies based in the Columbus, Ohio metropolitan area
Mutual insurance companies of the United States